Vithura, also known as the Hill City Of Trivandrum, is located 36 km from Thiruvananthapuram capital of the Kerala state in India.  Vithura is the culmination of the crossroads to many tourist, cultural, and religious centres. Surrounded by the Western Ghats (Sahyadris), Vithura is a prime tourist spot. The village is rich with a very scenic beauty and a good climate year-round. The Indian Institute of Science Education and Research, Thiruvananthapuram campus, one of the leading public science universities in the country, is situated here.

Demography
Vithura is a town located in Nedumangad Taluk of Thiruvananthapuram district, Kerala with total 5163 families residing. Population of Vithura counts 18437 persons of which 8680 are males while 9757 are females as per Population Census 2011. Vithura village has lower literacy rate compared to Kerala. In 2011, literacy rate of Vithura village was 88.64% compared to 94.00% of Kerala. Here, male literacy stands at 92.18% while female literacy rate was 85.54%. Schedule Tribe (ST) constitutes 18.17% while Schedule Caste (SC) were 12.37% of total population here. The 2001 census reported a population of 26,927.

Places of worship
The following are some of the places of worship in Vithura:
Sri Mahadeva Devi Temple, at Sivan Kovil Vithura
Sri Mudipura Bhadrakali Devi Temple at Sivan Covil Jn
Vellamkanni Matha church Vithura
Divine Providence Latin Catholic Church Vithura
CSI CHURCH Vithura
Sri Mahaganapathi Temple Maruthamala Vithura
Makki Sri Dharmasastha Kshethram Vithura
The Pentecostal Mission Vithura (TPM)
Sree Krishnaswami Temple
Sri Bhadrakali Devi Temple, at Chayam Vithura
All Saints Syro Malabar Church, at Koppam Vithura
St. Mary's Malankara Catholic Church Vithura
St. Joseph Latin Catholic Church Vithura
Sri Bhadrakali Devi Temple (Kulamancode), at Pulichamala
Sri Subhramanya kshethram chayam Vithura
 Muhiyudheen Jumah Masjid
 St. George Orthodox Church
Sri Mariyamman Devi Temple, Kallar
CSI Church Chayam

Educational institutions
Jawahar Navodaya Vidhyalayam VITHURA (Chettachal) 
Govt LPS Vithura
Govt UPS Vithura
Govt HS Vithura
Govt VHSC Vithura
Govt Welfare School Maruthamala, Vithura
All Saints Public School And Junior College, Vithura
MGM Ponmudi Valley Public School, Vithura
Indian Institute of Science Education and Research, Vithura, Thiruvananthapuram
Indian Institute of Space Science and Technology Valiyamala, near Vithura
Govt LPS Chayam, Vithura
Govt LPS Kallar, Vithura
Govt HS Anappara, Vithura
MMEMS Theviyode, Vithura
Ponmudi LP School, Vithura
NSS LPS Theviyode, Vithura
 Lena L P SCHOOL Anappety, Vithura
 Govt LP School Anappety, Vithura
Iqbal college & HSS school Perigamala, Vithura
Govt HSS Chettachal, Vithura

Hospitals
Govt Taluk Hospital Vithura
 V V Hospital Vithura
Govt Homeopathy Hospital Vithura and Kallar

Tourist spots

There are several rubber plantations throughout the area. Prominent tourist spots include Ponmudi, Peppara Dam, Meenmutty Falls, Bonacaud and Agastyakoodam. A stone's throw away from Vithura lies Iruthalamoola Junction in the Tholicode Panchayath. Iru in Malayalam means two, thala means head and moola means corner, suggesting that the place gets its name from the two roads from Trivandrum to Ponmudi and Vithura to Aryanad meeting here. Perched on a hill very close to Iruthalamoola stands a magnificently massive rock called Chittiparra, frequented by adrenaline junkies keen on the challenges of rock climbing. Lush green paddy fields, rubber plantations, and coconut gardens abound in scenic Vithura make it a classic, ideal Kerala hot spot, apart from the hundreds of tea plantation workers who work in the hills. A visit to the local kalaris (Traditional Martial Arts Schools) in the region is a must to every first time tourist.
Ponmudi Hill Resorts
Bonacaud Tea Gardens
Vazhventhole Water Falls
Lower Meenmutty dam
Thavakkal Water Fall
Peppara Dam
Peppara Hydro Electric Power Station
Thavakkal Waterfall
Golden Valley
Kallar River
Pandi pathu
Agastyarkoodam Trekking
Athirumala Base Camp
Attayar 
Vamanapuram River

References

Villages in Thiruvananthapuram district